William Nathan Harrell Smith (September 24, 1812 – November 14, 1889) was a United States Representative from North Carolina, and a chief justice of the North Carolina Supreme Court.

Biography
William N. H. Smith was born in Murfreesboro, North Carolina, September 24, 1812, and attended the common schools in Murfreesboro, N.C., Kingston, Rhode Island, and Colchester, Connecticut and East Lyme, Connecticut. He graduated from Yale College in 1834 and from Yale Law School in 1836, and was admitted to the bar and commenced practice in Murfreesboro, N.C., in 1839.

Smith held several local offices, including being a member of the State House of Commons in 1840, 1858, 1865, and 1866. He also served in the State Senate in 1848; was solicitor (prosecutor) of the first judicial district of North Carolina for eight years, and was elected as an Opposition Party candidate to the Thirty-sixth Congress (March 4, 1859 – March 3, 1861). He was unsuccessful candidate (backed by the American Party and many Democrats) for Speaker. He served in the Confederate Congress in 1862–1865, and was delegate to the Democratic National Convention at New York City in 1868. He served as counsel for Governor W. W. Holden in his 1871 impeachment trial, and was chief justice of the North Carolina Supreme Court from 1878 to 1889.

Smith died in Raleigh, North Carolina, November 14, 1889, and his remains were interred in Historic Oakwood Cemetery.

References

External links
 North Carolina Historical Marker
 

1812 births
1889 deaths
People from Murfreesboro, North Carolina
Opposition Party members of the United States House of Representatives from North Carolina
Deputies and delegates to the Provisional Congress of the Confederate States
Members of the Confederate House of Representatives from North Carolina
North Carolina Oppositionists
Democratic Party members of the North Carolina House of Representatives
Democratic Party North Carolina state senators
Chief Justices of the North Carolina Supreme Court
North Carolina lawyers
Yale Law School alumni
19th-century American politicians
Yale College alumni
19th-century American judges
19th-century American lawyers
Democratic Party members of the United States House of Representatives from North Carolina